Cleveland Law Range is a historic office building located at Spartanburg, Spartanburg County, South Carolina.  It was built in 1898–1899, and is a three-story, Richardsonian Romanesque style brick building.  It features five arched bays on the ground floor, with repeated bay arrangements on the second and third floors. Three South Carolina governors maintained offices in the Cleveland Law Range: James F. Byrnes, John Gary Evans, and Donald S. Russell.

It was listed on the National Register of Historic Places in 1973.

References

Office buildings on the National Register of Historic Places in South Carolina
Romanesque Revival architecture in South Carolina
Buildings and structures completed in 1899
Buildings and structures in Spartanburg, South Carolina
National Register of Historic Places in Spartanburg, South Carolina